Ahmet Arslan (born 1986 in Gazipaşa, Antalya) is a long-distance runner from Turkey competing in mountain running. He is a six time successive champion of European Mountain Running Championships.

Biography 
He was born in 1986 to a farmer's family in Gazipaşa of Antalya Province in southern Turkey. Ahmet Arslan has seven siblings. He completed his primary and secondary education in his hometown. After the high school, he attended Adnan Menderes University in Aydın and graduated 2009 with a degree in physical education and sports.

Ahmet Arslan started with athletics in 2000 at the high school. He had to discontinue sports in 2004 for one year. After 2005, he begin intensive running training, especially after meeting his coach Metin Sazak, a former athlete. He switched to mountain running from cross-country running. That year, he took part in the national mountain running championships and became successful although he competed in the seniors category despite his young age. Admitted to the national team, he participated at his first international events like the European Mountain Championships and the World Mountain Running Trophy and gained international experience.

From 2007 on, Ahmet Arslan won the European championships six times in a row. In 2010, he won the gold medal also at the WMRA Grand Prix. He was the silver medallist at the 2011 World Mountain Running Championships, coming second behind American Max King. In the absence of the American, he won the continental title at the 2011 European Mountain Running Championships held in Turkey. He won that year's WMRA Grand Prix series. He began 2012 with a win at the Montée du Grand Ballon race.
He has won the Red Bull 400 meter twice in a row.

Since mountain running sport is not recognized as an Olympic sports branch, he is complaining about not finding a sponsor for his active sports career.

Achievements

Awards
 In July 2011, Ahmet Arslan was awarded the title European Athlete of the Month.

References

1986 births
Living people
People from Gazipaşa
Adnan Menderes University alumni
Turkish male long-distance runners
Turkish mountain runners
Turkish male marathon runners
20th-century Turkish people
21st-century Turkish people